Juan Alfredo Barahona Peña (born 12 February 1996) is a Salvadoran professional footballer, who plays as a defender.

Club career

Santa Tecla
Barahona signed with Santa Tecla in 2014. On 9 December 2018, he scored in the 2–0 victory against Águila of the second leg of the semi-finals of the Apertura 2018.

Sacramento Republic FC
Barahona signed with Sacramento Republic on 6 May 2019.

Honours
Santa Tecla
 Primera División: Clausura 2015

International goals
Scores and results list El Salvador's goal tally first.

References

External links
 
 

1995 births
Living people
Salvadoran footballers
El Salvador international footballers
Association football defenders
2014 Copa Centroamericana players
2015 CONCACAF U-20 Championship players
2017 Copa Centroamericana players
Santa Tecla F.C. footballers
Sacramento Republic FC players
USL Championship players